Léopold Simoneau,  (May 3, 1916 – August 24, 2006) was a French-Canadian lyric tenor, one of the outstanding Mozarteans of his time. In 1959 he became the first recipient of the Calixa-Lavallée Award.

Life and career
Simoneau was born in Saint-Flavien, Quebec, and started his vocal studies in Quebec City at the Collège de Lévis and Université Laval. While studying in Montreal with Salvator Issaurel, he made his professional debut with Les Variétés Lyriques in Montréal in 1941.

He then left for New York City for complementary studies with Paul Althouse. In 1946 he appeared at the New York City Center as Lionel in Martha. That same year he married French-Canadian soprano Pierrette Alarie. Together they left for France.

Simoneau made his debut in 1949 at the Opéra-Comique of Paris as Vincent in Gounod's opera Mireille and at the Paris Opera as Tamino in Mozart's The Magic Flute. He made his debut at the Aix-en-Provence Festival in 1950 singing Ottavio in Don Giovanni and Ferrando in Così fan tutte. The following year, 1951, he made his debut at the Glyndebourne Festival as Idamante in Idomeneo. His performances at these two festivals quickly established him as the outstanding Mozartian tenor of his time. He was invited to sing at the Salzburg Festival and the Edinburgh International Festival, at the Vienna State Opera and at La Scala in Milan, while pursuing his career in France, in roles such as Nadir in Bizet's Les pêcheurs de perles, Gérald in Delibes' Lakmé. He took part in the revival of opera such as Rameau's Les Indes galantes and Orphée in the French version for tenor of Gluck's Orfeo ed Euridice. In France he was frequently singing opposite his wife, who was a light lyric coloratura soprano excelling in the same repertoire as her husband.

In the 1950s he made several famous recordings, including one of Mozart's Requiem with Bruno Walter conducting, and also in 1956 Berlioz's Requiem with The Wiener Staatsopernchor, The Wiener Philarmoniker conducted by Dimitri Mitropoulos. He also participated in two celebrated recordings with Philips Records, Les pêcheurs de perles conducted by Jean Fournet, and Gluck's Orphée et Euridyce conducted by Hans Rosbaud, in which he gave what some critics feel are the definitive performances of the roles of Nadir and Orphée. Simoneau also sang the role of Belmonte in Sir Thomas Beecham's recording of Mozart's Die Entführung aus dem Serail, and the role of Ferrando in Mozart's Così fan tutte opposite Elisabeth Schwarzkopf, Nan Merriman, Rolando Panerai, Lisa Otto, Sesto Bruscantini, conducted by Herbert von Karajan, both considered classics. He also sang in Charles Munch's critically acclaimed 1959 recording of the Berlioz Requiem.

Simoneau made his debut at the Lyric Opera of Chicago in 1954, he sang there until 1961, notably in Verdi's La traviata opposite Maria Callas. His only Metropolitan Opera appearances were five performances of Don Ottavio during the 1963-64 season.

Simoneau's final appearance was in Handel's Messiah in Montréal on November 24, 1970. He was made an Officer of the Order of Canada in 1971, he was promoted to Companion in 1995. Simoneau was also made a Knight of the National Order of Quebec in 1997.

After retiring, Simoneau and his wife became active as teachers, notably at the Banff Centre. They also founded the Canada Piccola Opera in Victoria, British Columbia, in 1982. The couple had two daughters, Isabelle and Chantal.

Léopold Simoneau died at his home on August 24, 2006, in Victoria, British Columbia, at the age of 90.

Sources
 Le Dictionnaire des disques et des compacts, Robert Laffont. 
 Alain Pâris, Dictionnaire des interprètes et de l'interpretation musicale au XX siècle (2 vols), Éditions Robert Laffont (Bouquins, Paris 1982, 4th edn. 1995, 5th edn 2004). 
 D. Hamilton (ed.),The Metropolitan Opera Encyclopedia: A Complete Guide to the World of Opera (Simon and Schuster, New York 1987). 
 Roland Mancini and Jean-Jacques Rouveroux, (orig. H. Rosenthal and J. Warrack, French edition), Guide de l’opéra, Les indispensables de la musique (Fayard, 1995).

External links
Léopold Simoneau at The Canadian Encyclopedia
Two interviews with Léopold Simoneau and Pierrette Alarie by Bruce Duffie, May 1, 1986 and August 23, 1987
http://Leopold Simoneau and Pierrette Alarie fonds at Library and Archives Canada

1916 births
2006 deaths
Canadian operatic tenors
Knights of the National Order of Quebec
Companions of the Order of Canada
French Quebecers
Singers from Quebec
20th-century Canadian male opera singers
Université Laval alumni
Canadian expatriates in France